The large moth subfamily Lymantriinae contains the following genera beginning with F:

Fanala

References 

Lymantriinae
Lymantriid genera F